The Central African Republic competed at the 2020 Summer Olympics in Tokyo. Originally scheduled to take place from 24 July to 9 August 2020, the Games have been postponed to 23 July to 8 August 2021, due to the COVID-19 pandemic. It was the nations tenth appearance at the Summer Olympics since its debut in 1968. Central African Republic failed to register any athletes at the 1972 Summer Olympics in Munich, and was part of the African and United States-led boycotts in 1976 and 1980, respectively.

Competitors
The following is the list of number of competitors in the Games.

Athletics

The Central African Republic received a universality slot from the World Athletics to send one male athlete to the Olympics.

Track & road events

Swimming

Central African Republic received a universality invitation from FINA to send a top-ranked female swimmer in her respective individual events to the Olympics, based on the FINA Points System of June 28, 2021.

References

External links
 Central African Republic at the 2020 Summer Olympics at Olympedia

Olympics
2020
Nations at the 2020 Summer Olympics